Harinder Singh Mehboob (born 1937, Chakk, in Lyallpur district Punjab, British India) was a Punjabi poet.

Books 
Sahije racio K̲h̲alasā  
History and philosophy of Khalsa Sect 
Ilāhī nadara de paiṇḍe 
Jhanāṃ dī rāta

Awards
Mehboob won the Sahitya Akademi Award in 1991 for his poetry Jhanaan dī rāat .

See also
List of Sahitya Akademi Award winners for Punjabi

References

Poets from Punjab, India
Punjabi-language writers
Recipients of the Sahitya Akademi Award in Punjabi
1937 births
Living people
20th-century Indian poets